This article lists political parties in Peru.
Peru has a multi-party system with several political parties competing in legislative elections according to a party-list proportional representation system. As a consequence, it is rare for any single political organization to obtain an absolute majority in the Congress of Peru, thus, these parties often work with each other to form coalition governments.

Parties represented in Congress

Other parties

 All for Peru
Agricultural People's Front of Peru
Christian Peoples' Party
Communist Party of Peru (Red Fatherland)
 Communist Party of Peru (Marxist-Leninist) (Peruvian Communist Party – Red Flag)
Contigo
Direct Democracy
The Broad Front for Justice, Life and Freedom
 Green Alternative Ecologist Party of Peru
Let's Go Peru
National Victory
National United Renaissance 
 Peru Nation
Peruvian Aprista Party
Peruvian Communist Party
Peruvian Democratic Party
Peruvian Nationalist Party
Peru Secure Homeland
Sí Cumple
Union for Peru

Historical political parties

 Civilista Party (Partido Civil)
 Decentralist Party
 Decentralist Party of the South
 Democrat Party
 Democratic Party (Partido Demócrata)
 Democratic Vanguard Party
 Independent Civil Party
 Labour Party of Peru
 Liberal Party (Partido Liberal del Perú)
 National Alliance
 National Civic Union
 National Union (Unión Nacional)
 National Party (Partido Nacional)
 National Integration Party
 National Renewal Movement
 Nationalist Party of Peru (Eguiguren)
 Nationalist Party of Peru (Revilla)
 Odriíst National Union (Unión Nacional Odriísta)
 Peruvian Democratic Union
 Regionalist National Party of the Centre
 Republican Party of Peru
 Revolutionary Democratic Action
 Revolutionary Vanguard (Politico-Military)
 Urban Rural Trade Unionist Party of Peru

Former Coalitions
 Popular Action-Christian Democracy Alliance (Alianza Acción Popular-Democracia Cristiana)
 APRA-UNO Coalition (Coalición APRA-UNO)
 United Left (Izquierda Unida)
 Democratic Convergence (Convergencia Democrática)
 Socialist Left (Socialist Left)
 Democratic Front (Frente Democrático, FREDEMO)
 Peru 2000 (Perú 2000)
 National Unity (Unidad Nacional)
 Alliance for the Future (Alianza por el Futuro)
 Center Front (Frente de Centro)
 Decentralization Coalition (Concertación Descentralista)
 Alliance for the Great Change (Alianza por el Gran Cambio)
 Possible Peru Alliance (Alianza Electoral Perú Posible)
 Popular Alliance (Alianza Popular)
 Alliance for the Progress of Peru (Alianza para el Progreso del Perú)
 National Solidarity Alliance (Alianza Solidaridad Nacional)

Armed rebel groups
Shining Path (also known as Partido Comunista del Perú – Sendero Luminoso)
Túpac Amaru Revolutionary Movement (Movimiento Revolucionario Túpac Amaru)
Revolutionary Left Movement (Movimiento de la Izquierda Revolucionaria)

See also
 Politics of Peru
 List of political parties by country
 Liberalism in Peru

References

Peru
 
Political parties
Political parties
Peru